Golovino is a rural locality (a selo) in Belgorodsky District, Belgorod Oblast, Russia. The population was 837 as of 2010. There are 26 streets.

Geography 
Golovino is located 11 km south of Maysky (the district's administrative centre) by road. Politotdelsky is the nearest rural locality.

References 

Rural localities in Belgorodsky District
Belgorodsky Uyezd